Chris Williams is an Australian former professional rugby league footballer who played in the 1990s. He played for the Penrith Panthers and Western Suburbs in the NSWRL/ARL competition.

Playing career
Williams made his first grade debut for Penrith in round 22 of the 1990 NSWRL season against Western Suburbs at Campbelltown Sports Ground. Williams played off the interchange bench in Penrith's 22-12 loss. In 1992, Williams made one appearance for Penrith in round 20 against the Illawarra Steelers. In 1993, Williams joined Western Suburbs and played three seasons with the club before being released at the end of 1995.

References

Western Suburbs Magpies players
Penrith Panthers players
Australian rugby league players
Rugby league hookers
Living people
Year of birth missing (living people)